Lexington (March 17, 1850 – July 1, 1875) was a United States Thoroughbred race horse who won six of his seven race starts. Perhaps his greatest fame, however, came as the most successful sire of the second half of the nineteenth century; he was the leading sire in North America 16 times, and broodmare sire of many notable racehorses.

Background
Lexington was a bay colt bred by Dr. Elisha Warfield at Warfield's stud farm, The Meadows, near Lexington, Kentucky. Lexington was by the Hall of Fame inductee, Boston (by Timoleon by Sir Archy) from Alice Carneal by Sarpedon. He was inbred in the third and fourth generations (3m × 4f) to Sir Archy. At stud, he developed a willful and somewhat vicious temperament.

Racing record
Under the name of "Darley" Lexington easily won his first two races for Dr. Warfield and his partner, "Burbridge's Harry", a former slave turned well-known horse trainer. Burbridge, being black, was not allowed to enter "Darley" in races in his own name, so the horse ran in Dr. Warfield's name and colors.  He caught the eye of Richard Ten Broeck who asked Dr. Warfield to name his price. "Darley", the son of Boston, was sold in 1853 to Ten Broeck acting on behalf of a syndicate who would rename him Lexington. Affixed to Lexington's pedigree Dr. Warfield wrote: "The colt was bred by me, as was also his dam, which I now and will ever, own...E. Warfield."

A syndicate made up of Richard Ten Broeck, General Abe Buford, Captain Willa Viley, and Junius R. Ward, bought Lexington for $2,500 between heats (or during the running of his race), so tried claiming the purse money when he won. Failing that, he tried to deduct the purse money from the sale price. But Dr. Warfield held out. His new owners immediately sent Lexington to Natchez, Mississippi to train under J. B. Pryor.

Lexington raced at age three and four and although he only competed seven times, many of his races were grueling four-mile events. Lexington won six of his seven races and finished second once. One of his wins was the Phoenix Hotel Handicap in 1853.  On April 2, 1855, at the Metairie race course in New Orleans, he set a record running four miles in 7 minutes, 19  seconds, running against time. Even with his complex and hard-fought rivalry with the horse Lecomte (also a son of Boston, both born just after Boston died), he was known as the best race horse of his day. His second match with Lecomte on April 14, 1855, was considered one of the greatest matches of the century.  But Lexington had to be retired at the end of 1855 as a result of poor eyesight.  His sire, Boston, had also gone blind. Conservation work in 2010 revealed that Lexington had had a massive facial infection that resulted in his going blind.

Stud record

Lexington stood for a time at the Nantura Stock Farm of Uncle John Harper in Midway, Kentucky, along with the famous racer and sire, Glencoe. Sold to Robert A. Alexander for $15,000 in 1858, reportedly the then highest price ever paid for an American horse, Lexington was sent to Alexander's Woodburn Stud at Spring Station, Kentucky.

He stood for a price of $100 until 1861, when he first led the sire list, and it was increased to $200. He stood for a limited public fee of $500, the highest in the country and comparable to the leading English stallions, in 1865 and 1866 before being restricted to private stud duties only.

Called "The Blind Hero of Woodburn", Lexington became the leading sire in North America sixteen times, from 1861 through 1874, and then again in 1876 and 1878. Lexington was the sire of the undefeated Asteroid and Norfolk. Nine of the first fifteen Travers Stakes were won by one of his sons or daughters. Among his noted progeny are:

      

Lexington's three Preakness Stakes winners equaled the record of another great sire, Broomstick.

In all Lexington sired 236 winners who won 1,176 races, ran second 348 times and third 42 times for $1,159,321 in prize money.

During the American Civil War, horses were forcibly conscripted from the Kentucky farms to serve as mounts in the bloody fray. Lexington, 15 years old and blind, had to be hidden away to save him from such a fate. He was sent to Illinois for this purpose.

Lexington died at Woodburn on July 1, 1875, and was buried in a casket in front of the stables. A few years later, in 1878, his owner, through the auspices of Dr. J.M. Toner, donated the horse's bones to the U.S. National Museum (the Smithsonian Institution). The pioneering taxidermist Henry Augustus Ward of Ward's Natural Science in Rochester, New York, was called in to supervise the disinterment and preparation of the skeleton. For many years the specimen was exhibited in the Osteology Hall of the National Museum of Natural History. In 1999, Lexington was part of the exhibition "On Time", at the National Museum of American History, where he helped illustrate the history of the first mass-produced stopwatch that split time into fractions of seconds—which was supposedly developed to document Lexington's feats on the race course. In 2010, Smithsonian conservators prepared the skeleton for loan to the International Museum of the Horse in Lexington, Kentucky, in time for the World Equestrian Games in Kentucky, the first time these games had been held outside of Europe.

Lexington's dominance in the pedigrees of American-bred Thoroughbreds, and the fact that the British Thoroughbred breeders considered him not a purebred, was a large factor in the so-called Jersey Act of 1913, in which the British Jockey Club limited the registration of horses not traced completely to horses in the General Stud Book.

Lexington did additionally have one foal start in 1858 as a two-year-old, finishing second in a single start.

Honors
Lexington was part of the first group of horses inducted into the National Museum of Racing and Hall of Fame in 1955. The Belmont Lexington Stakes runs every year at Belmont Park in honor of Lexington, as does the Lexington Stakes at Keeneland Race Course.

On Tuesday, August 31, 2010 the Smithsonian loaned Lexington's skeleton to the International Museum of the Horse at the Kentucky Horse Park, to be exhibited there through August 2013.

Lexington served as the model for the top of the Woodlawn Vase, given to the winner of the Preakness Stakes at Pimlico.

Lexington was exhibited at the 1859 Great St. Louis Fair.

Legacy
Lexington was the leading sire in North America a record 16 times. His sire line originally flourished, especially through Norfolk (who in turn produced champions Emperor of Norfolk and El Rio Rey), but then faced increasing competition from European imports. By 1981 his sire line became extinct. However, his influence on the pedigrees of the modern Thoroughbred can still be felt through his daughters, who produced winners Spendthrift, Himyar, Hanover, and Bramble. Himyar in turn established a sire line that has survived into the 21st century through Holy Bull, who sired both 2005 Kentucky Derby winner Giacomo and 2000 Breeders' Cup Juvenile winner Mucho Uno. In turn, Mucho Uno sired 2013 Breeders' Cup Classic winner Mucho Macho Man, the sire of 2020 Pegasus World Cup winner Mucho Gusto. Likewise, the Spendthrift line has survived into the 21st century through Tiznow, who won the Breeders Cup Classic in consecutive years (2000, 2001); he in turn produced 2008 Belmont Stakes winner Da' Tara, and 2008 Santa Anita Derby and Travers Stakes winner Colonel John.

Lexington is the subject of the best selling novel Horse by Geraldine Brooks, published in 2022.

Pedigree
Some of the horses in Lexington's pedigree cannot be traced back to England's General Stud Book, a fact that can probably be attributed to the disruptions and sometimes hazardous record keeping in the period between the American Revolution and Civil War. The pedigree shown on The Jockey Club's Equineline database is thus incomplete, not showing the dams of Timoleon, Florizel and the Alderman Mare. The pedigree shown below fills in those gaps based on American records.

Lexington is usually said to descend from family 12-b in the female line through his third dam Lady Grey. However, the mitochondrial DNA of descendants of Lady Grey is inconsistent with that of other members of family 12-b, indicating a likely mismatch.

Lexington was inbred 3 × 4 to the stallion Sir Archy and 4 × 4 to the stallion Diomed, meaning that both horses appears twice in his pedigree — Sir Archy in the third and fourth generations, and Diomed twice in the fourth generation.

See also
 List of historical horses
 List of leading Thoroughbred racehorses
 Horsemanship of Ulysses S. Grant—Lexington's off spring, Cincinnati, is feature here.

References

 The Spell of the Turf by Samuel C. Hildreth and James R. Crowell, J. B. Lippincott & Co., 192
 Biography of Lexington at Thoroughbred Heritage

External links

 Thoroughbred Bloodlines: Lexington
 Lexington's Hall of Fame page
 Lexington at the International Museum of the Horse

1850 racehorse births
1875 racehorse deaths
Racehorses bred in Kentucky
Racehorses trained in the United States
United States Champion Thoroughbred Sires
United States Thoroughbred Racing Hall of Fame inductees
Byerley Turk sire line
Thoroughbred family 12-b